Blackhawk is a 1952 American  15-chapter science fiction adventure movie serial from Columbia Pictures, based on the comic book Blackhawk, first published by Quality Comics, but later owned by competitor DC Comics. It was Columbia's forty-ninth serial. The one-sheet poster referred to the serial as The Miraculous Blackhawk: Freedom's Champion. The home video release added the tagline: "Fearless Champion of Freedom".

Blackhawk stars Kirk Alyn as Blackhawk and Carol Forman as the foreign spy that must be stopped from stealing the experimental super-fuel "Element-X"; Alyn and Forman were also the hero and villain of Columbia's earlier Superman. 

Blackhawk was produced by the famously cheap Sam Katzman and directed by the team of Spencer Gordon Bennet and Fred F. Sears. It is considered cheap and lackluster, made in the waning years of studio movie serial production.

Premise
A flying squadron of World War II veterans, The International Brotherhood, is a private flying investigative force led by Blackhawk. They uncover a gang of underworld henchmen, led by the notorious foreign spy Laska, who reports to The Leader, a mystery man. During the serial, Blackhawk and his flying squadron set about bringing these criminals to justice, following a series of cliff-hanger adventures.

Cast
 Kirk Alyn as Blackhawk
 Michael Fox as Mr. Case
 Don C. Harvey as Olaf (as Don Harvey)
 Rick Vallin as Stan/Boris 
 John Crawford as Chuck
 Frank Ellis as Hendrickson [Chs. 1-2,4,8-9]
 Larry Stewart as Andre
 Weaver Levy as Chop-Chop
 Carol Forman as Laska
 Zon Murray as Bork
 Nick Stuart as Cress
 Marshall Reed as Aller
 Pierce Lyden as Dyke
 William Fawcett as Dr. Rolph [Chs.4-7]
 Rory Mallinson as Hodge [Chs. 11-14]

Chapter titles
 Distress Call from Space
 Blackhawk Traps a Traitor
 In the Enemy's Hideout
 The Iron Monster
 Human Targets
 Blackhawk's Leap for Life
 Mystery Fuel
 Blasted from the Sky
 Blackhawk Tempts Fate
 Chase for Element X
 Forced Down
 Drums of Doom
 Blackhawk's Daring Plan
 Blackhawk's Wild Ride
 The Leader Unmasked

Production
Writer George Plympton described a production staff meeting where they listened to a recording of the short-lived Blackhawk radio series. Everyone at the meeting was "aghast at the confusing babble of accents". For Columbia's serial, all recruits of the Blackhawk squadron speak with standard American accents.

Stunts
In chapter 3 Kirk Alyn performs a potentially dangerous stunt without the use of a stunt double. In order to save the life of squadron member Stan, who's tied to a stake in the path of a taxiing plane, Blackhawk (Alyn) runs up to the vehicle and turns it aside by grabbing the wing. A hidden pilot inside the plane steered it to simulate the movement. When writing this scene, the screenwriters were thinking of a small lighter wood-and-canvas plane, not the heavy metal aircraft used in the final scene; it could have easily killed Alyn if the stunt's timing had gone wrong.

Home media
The serial was released on VHS in 1997 by Columbia TriStar Home Video. In 2016, it was released on DVD by Mill Creek Entertainment under license from Sony Pictures Home Entertainment.

Critical reception
William C. Cline describes the serial as a "pretty good airplane adventure" in his book In the Nick of Time. Despite this, Blackhawk was the last aviation serial; fliers had rapidly become less impressive in American popular culture, and science fiction was taking its place.

Made during the 1950s, Blackhawk was produced after the movie serial's heyday; many from this period were generally inferior to those made in the previous decade.

References

External links

1952 films
1950s English-language films
1950s crime films
American aviation films
American black-and-white films
Columbia Pictures film serials
Films directed by Spencer Gordon Bennet
Films directed by Fred F. Sears
Live-action films based on DC Comics
Films with screenplays by George H. Plympton
1950s American films
Films based on DC Comics